Jerry Sconce is a former American football coach and convicted criminal.  He was the fifth head football coach  at Azusa Pacific College—now known as Azusa Pacific University—in Azusa, California, serving for six seasons, from 1972  to 1977. and compiling a record of 24–31.

Criminal charges
Sconce operated the Lamb Funeral Home with his wife, Laurieanne Lamb Sconce. The Sconces were arrested on numerous charges relating to forgery of donor consent forms, removal of organs and body parts from the dead and selling them to organ banks and for scientific research, removal of gold dental fillings, and theft of funds from trust accounts.  They were each sentenced to three years and eight months in prison.

References

Year of birth missing (living people)
Living people
American businesspeople convicted of crimes
American sportspeople convicted of crimes
Azusa Pacific Cougars football coaches
American funeral directors
High school football coaches in California
High school football coaches in Oregon
Junior college football coaches in the United States
UC Santa Barbara Gauchos football players